The 2015 season was the 103rd season of competitive soccer in the United States.

National teams

Men

Senior

Friendlies

CONCACAF Gold Cup

2015 CONCACAF Cup (2017 FIFA Confederations Cup play-off)

2018 FIFA World Cup qualification

Goalscorers

Under-23

Friendlies

Toulon Tournament

CONCACAF Olympic Qualifying Championship

Under-20

CONCACAF U-20 Championship

Friendlies

FIFA U-20 World Cup

Stevan Vilotic Tournament

Four Nations Tournament

Under-18

Copa Chivas

Friendlies

Under-17

CONCACAF U-17 Championship

FIFA U-17 World Cup

Under-15

Torneo delle Nazioni

Friendlies

Women

Senior

Friendlies

Algarve Cup

FIFA Women's World Cup

Under-23

La Manga Tournament

Four Nations Tournament

American club leagues

Major League Soccer

Conference tables 
 Eastern Conference

 Western Conference

Overall table 
Note: the table below has no impact on playoff qualification and is used solely for determining host of the MLS Cup, certain CCL spots, the Supporters' Shield trophy, seeding in the 2016 Canadian Championship, and 2016 MLS draft. The conference tables are the sole determinant for teams qualifying for the playoffs.

North American Soccer League

Spring Season

Fall Season

USL 

Eastern Conference

Western Conference

National Women's Soccer League

Overall table

US Open Cup

Final

American clubs in international competition 

teams in bold are still active in the competition

2014–15 CONCACAF Champions League

Knock-Out stage

D.C. United

2015–16 CONCACAF Champions League

Group stage

D.C. United 

D.C. advanced to the quarterfinals, played in 2016

LA Galaxy 

LA advanced to the quarterfinals, played in 2016

Real Salt Lake 

Real Salt Lake advanced to the quarterfinals, played in 2016

Seattle Sounders FC 

Seattle advanced to the quarterfinals, played in 2016

Honors

Professional

Amateur

References

 
Seasons in American soccer